Lim Jin-wook (born 22 April 1991) is a South Korean footballer who plays as midfielder for Chungju Hummel in K League Challenge.

Career
He was selected by Chungju Hummel in 2014 K League draft. He made his debut goal in the league game against Daegu FC on 8 June.

References

External links 

1991 births
Living people
Association football midfielders
South Korean footballers
Chungju Hummel FC players
K League 2 players
Dongguk University alumni